The Championship Final was a playoff series at the end of the RFL Championship season to determine the winners of the Championship. It was first contested in 1908 between Hunslet and Oldham but folded in 1972. The Super League Grand Final replaced it in 1998.

Champions

Winning records by club

§ Denotes club now defunct

See also

Super League Grand Final

References

External links

Rugby league competitions in the United Kingdom
Rugby Football League
Rugby Football League Championship